The № 1 New Zealand General Hospital (1NZGH) was a World War I military hospital in Brockenhurst, Hampshire, England. The hospital was established in June 1916, after moving from Abasseyeh in Egypt.  It was operated by the Royal New Zealand Army Medical Corps. It had been the Lady Hardinge Hospital for Wounded Indian Soldiers.

Two large hotels in the parish: the Balmer Lawn Hotel and Forest Park Hotel were taken over and became a part of the new hospital, they could each hold 200 beds. 1NZGH became the orthopaedic centre for the New Zealand Medical Service in Britain.

On occasions during 1918 nearly 1,600 patients were accommodated at the hospital. Between 1916 and its closure 1919 the hospital cared for over 20,000 patients. Auckland Avenue and Auckland Place in Brockenhurst are named to commemorate the many New Zealanders who served at the Hospital during World War I.

Saint Nicholas Churchyard has 106 graves of those who died from the war including 93 New Zealanders, three Indian and three unidentified Belgian civilians.

See also
No. 2 New Zealand General Hospital, in Walton-on-Thames, England
No. 3 New Zealand General Hospital, in Codford, Wiltshire, England.

References

Further reading
. The official history of the medical service.
.

. Includes material relating to both Australian and New Zealand nurses.

External links
 Brockenhurst a First World War Hospital village 1916
 World War I Destinations Information on Brockenhurst in World War I. 
 Pathe Gazette No. 541, Brockenhurst & Lymington. A Token of Appreciation (New Zealanders Present Flags Prior To Their Departure For Home). Historic film of the Commanding Office of the No. 1 New Zealand General Hospital, Brockenhurst, and his principal matron presenting a New Zealand flag to the mayor of Lymington before similar scenes at the church at Brockenhurst where a New Zealand flag is presented into the safekeeping of the church. The final scenes show the graves of the New Zealanders buried in the churchyard. 
New Zealand War Graves - St Nicholas – a list of the New Zealand war graves at Brockenhursh Parish Church
NZEF in England 1916-19 map. A map showing the infrastructure of N.Z.E.F camps, hospitals, depots and offices in England.
One Woman, One Ambulance, WWI. Article about the experiences of Deborah Pitts Taylor at Brockenhurst.
Lady Hardinge & Tin Town – Brockenhurst’s Military Hospitals – Stories From The Great War Part 6
  This report written by F. F. Perry and published in the Indian Medical Gazette covers the period 20 January to 15 June 1915.

Military units and formations of the New Zealand Army
Military hospitals in the United Kingdom
Hospitals disestablished in 1919
Hospitals in Hampshire
Defunct hospitals in England
Military history of Hampshire